The Beaver River, also known as the Beavermouth Creek or Beaver Creek, is a tributary of the Columbia River in British Columbia, Canada, joining that river in the Rocky Mountain Trench northwest of the town of Golden.  It enters the Columbia via Kinbasket Lake.

The Beaver River is the eastern egress from the Rogers Pass and its valley is the route of the Trans-Canada Highway and Canadian Pacific Railway on that side of the pass, and it is located in Glacier National Park.  Its lower reaches are officially named Beaver Canyon. The pass between the Beaver River and the Duncan River forms the dividing line between the Selkirks and the Purcell Mountains.

A semi-decommissioned hiking trail follows the Beaver from the Trans-Canada highway for much of its length, including now-abandoned spurs to Copperstain Pass and Glacier Circle. The trail no longer receives maintenance from Parks Canada, which closed remaining stream crossings in 2009.

See also
List of tributaries of the Columbia River
List of British Columbia rivers

References

External links
Canadian GeoNames Database entry "Beaver River, British Columbia"
Location map from Canadian GeoNames Database

Columbia Country
Rivers of British Columbia
Canyons and gorges of British Columbia
Tributaries of the Columbia River
Kootenay Land District